Kis Kis Ki Kismat is a 2004 Indian black comedy film directed by Govind Menon, starring Dharmendra and Mallika Sherawat. Supporting roles were played by Satish Shah, Tinnu Anand, Jagdeep, Viju Khote, Dinesh Hingoo and Shivaji Satam. Tamil composer D. Imman composed the music, making his Bollywood debut. The film received negative reviews.

Cast

 Dharmendra as Hasmukh Mehta
 Mallika Sherawat as Meena Madhok
 Rati Agnihotri as Kokila Hasmukh Mehta
 Siddharth Makkar as Harish Mehta
 Satish Shah as Ahmed Rafsanjani
 Kurush Deboo as Khaled Mahmud
 Tinnu Anand as Aditya Sanganeria
 Dinesh Hingoo as Meena's maternal uncle
 Jagdeep as Dipankar Chattopadya
 Geeta Khanna as Lily
 Viju Khote as Gogi Dhanda / Inspector Dhandekar
 Tiku Talsania as Nimesh Popley
 Suresh Menon as Ramalingam
 Shivaji Satam as Minister
 Chetan Pandit as Fatman
 Ajit Kulkarni as Mehta's partner
 Manmauji

Soundtrack
The music was composed by D. Imman and released by Das Music. All lyrics were penned by Farhad Wadia.

References

External links
 

2000s sex comedy films
Indian sex comedy films
2004 films
2000s Hindi-language films
2004 comedy films